Kevin Indunan Belingon (born October 30, 1987) is a Filipino mixed martial artist currently signed to ONE Championship. He is a former ONE Bantamweight World Champion and Universal Reality Combat Championship (URCC) Flyweight Champion. Belingon has competed in several Asian-based MMA promotions.

Early life and education

Belingon hails from Kiangan, Ifugao, Philippines. In his early childhood he idolized and admired movie icon Bruce Lee, which then inspired him to practice martial arts. Belingon pursued his passion in martial arts at the age of 17 and was eventually awarded a wushu scholarship to the University of the Cordilleras. He had success in wushu competition, becoming a Philippines national champion. After finishing college, Belingon stayed in Baguio.

In Baguio, he began training at Team Lakay Wushu, one of the best MMA stables in the Philippines under famous Filipino coach Mark Sangiao. Although he earned a bachelor's degree in Criminology, he put his ambitions of pursuing a career in law enforcement on hold to focus full-time on being a professional Martial Artist.

He made his professional debut in 2007 and won his first nine bouts, capturing a flyweight title in the process after beating opponents from all across Asia. ONE Championship signed Belingon in 2012.

Mixed martial arts career

Universal Reality Combat Championship

On June 30, 2007, Kevin Belingon made his professional debut in Universal Reality Combat Championship, at URCC 10. The event was held on June 30, 2007, at The Fort in Taguig, Metro Manila, Philippines. Also on the fight card was Belingon's teammate and future ONE Championship world champion, Eduard Folayang. The Ifugao warrior fought Richard Lasprilla for the URCC Flyweight Championship and won via Majority Decision in his first professional MMA fight.

Martial combat

After 5 fights exclusively in his home country Philippines, Belingon entered the Singapore-based promotion Martial Combat in May 2010 in his first international fight against Thailand Fighter Ngoo Ditty, and won via first round TKO.

Legend Fighting Championship

More than a month, after his fight in Martial Combat Promotions, he fought under the banner of Legend Fighting Championship MMA Promotions based in China. Winning against Nam Jin Jo of South Korea via Unanimous Decision in June 2010 and Dalai Bayin of China in round 1 Submission in September 2010.

Returning to the URCC 
After his international fights in Hong Kong and Singapore, "The Silencer" returned home to compete at URCC 19: Collision in Pasay, Metro Manila on April 2, 2011, against fellow Filipino Isaac Tulinng. A head kick and combination of punches forced the referee to stop the contest, awarding Belingon the win via TKO.

ONE Championship

Belingon made his debut in the promotion against Masakazu Imanari at ONE Fighting Championship: War of the Lions March 2012. He submitted Belingon in the opening round via heel hook. Belingon also lost his next bout by unanimous decision against Korean Soo Chul Kim, who went on to become the inaugural ONE Bantamweight World Champion two months later.

After back-to-back defeats, Belingon entered the ONE Bantamweight Grand Prix Tournament and won back-to-back stoppages against Yusup Saadulaev, and Thanh Vu of Australia. He eventually lost against Masakatsu Ueda in the final round of ONE Bantamweight Grand Prix.

In January 2016, after a win against Koetsu Okazaki, he got the opportunity to challenge for the title against the champion, Bibiano Fernandes. He lost this title fight via Kimura in the first round.

His next victory came over Muin Gafurov in October 2016. Belingon followed it up with a pair of first round stoppages of former title contenders Toni Tauru, and Reece McLaren in 2017, before ending the year with a unanimous decision win against Kevin Chung.

On 20 April 2018, in the main event of ONE Championship: Heroes of Honor, Belingon faced off with another former title challenger Andrew Leone. Belingon dominated the first round until a spinning side-kick to the liver sent Leone to the canvas. The Filipino finished the fight with ground and pound.

On July 27, 2018, at ONE Championship: Reign of Kings, Belingon faced two-division ONE Championship title holder, Martin Nguyen. He defeated the Vietnamese-Australian by unanimous decision and became the ONE Championship Interim Bantamweight Champion.

Belingon faced reigning bantamweight champion Bibiano Fernandes at ONE Championship 78: Heart of the Lion on November 9, 2018, in a title unification bout and a rematch of their previous battle in 2016. Belingon won the fight via split decision to become the undisputed bantamweight champion, handing Fernandes his first loss in 8 years and ending the promotion's longest ever championship reign.

Belingon faced Fernandes in a trilogy match at ONE Championship: A New Era on March 30, 2019.  The match ended with Belingon losing the bantamweight title via disqualification after landing an illegal elbow to the back of Fernandes' head.

Belingon faced Fernandes for the fourth time at ONE Championship: Century on October 13, 2019. He lost the fight via a rear-naked choke submission in the second round.

Belingon then faced John Lineker at ONE Championship: Inside the Matrix 3 on November 13, 2020. He lost the fight via second-round knockout.

Belingon faced Kwon Won Il at ONE: Winter Warriors II on December 17, 2021. He lost the bout via liver shot in the second round.

Belingon faced Kim Jae Woong on November 19, 2022, at ONE on Prime Video 4. He lost the fight via technical knockout in the first round.

Personal life
Belingon and his wife have a daughter, Kelsey (born 2020).

Championships and accomplishments
ONE Championship
ONE Bantamweight World Championship (one time; former)
Interim ONE Bantamweight World Championship (one time; former)Universal Reality Combat Championship'''
URCC Flyweight Champion (one time; former)

Mixed martial arts record

|-
|Loss
|align=center|20–10
|Kim Jae Woong
|TKO (punches)
|ONE on Prime Video 4
|
|align=center|1
|align=center|2:33
|Kallang, Singapore
|
|-
| Loss
| align=center|20–9
| Kwon Won Il
| TKO (punch to the body)
| ONE: Winter Warriors II
| 
| align=center| 2
| align=center| 0:52
| Kallang, Singapore
| 
|-
| Loss
| align=center| 20–8
| John Lineker
| TKO (punches)
| ONE: Inside the Matrix 3
| 
| align=center|2
| align=center|1:16
| Kallang, Singapore
| 
|-
| Loss
| align=center| 20–7
| Bibiano Fernandes
| Submission (rear-naked choke)
| ONE: Century Part 2
| 
| align=center|2
| align=center|2:16
| Tokyo, Japan
| 
|-
| Loss
| align=center| 20–6
| Bibiano Fernandes
| DQ (illegal elbows)
| ONE: A New Era
| 
| align=center|3
| align=center|3:40
| Tokyo, Japan
| 
|-
| Win
| align=center| 20–5
| Bibiano Fernandes
| Decision (split)
| ONE: Heart of the Lion
| 
| align=center|5
| align=center|5:00
| Kallang, Singapore
| 
|-
| Win
| align=center| 19–5
| Martin Nguyen
| Decision (unanimous)
| ONE: Reign of Kings
| 
| align=center|5
| align=center|5:00
| Pasay, Philippines
| 
|-
| Win
| align=center| 18–5
| Andrew Leone
| TKO (spinning back kick and knees)
| ONE: Heroes of Honor
| 
| align=center|2
| align=center|1:27
| Manila, Philippines
|
|-
| Win
| align=center| 17–5
| Kevin Chung
| Decision (unanimous)
| ONE: Legends of the World
| 
| align=center|3
| align=center|5:00
| Pasay, Philippines
|
|-
| Win
| align=center| 16–5
| Reece McLaren
| KO (punches)
| ONE: Quest for Greatness
| 
| align=center| 1
| align=center| 1:02
| Kuala Lumpur, Malaysia
| 
|-
| Win
| align=center| 15–5
| Toni Tauru
| TKO (punches)
| ONE :Kings of Dynasty
| 
| align=center| 1
| align=center| 2:27
| Pasay, Philippines
| 
|-
| Win
| align=center| 14–5
| Muin Gafurov
| Decision (unanimous)
| ONE 38: Clash of Heroes
| 
| align=center| 3
| align=center| 5:00
| Yangon, Myanmar
| 
|-
| Loss
| align=center| 13–5
| Bibiano Fernandes
| Submission (kimura)
| ONE FC 37: Dynasty of Champion 5
| 
| align=center| 1
| align=center| 4:04
| Changsha, Hunan China
| 
|-
|  Win
| align=center| 13–4
| Koetsu Okazaki
| Decision (unanimous)
| ONE FC 23: Warrior's Way
| 
| align=center| 3
| align=center| 5:00
| Manila, Philippines
| 
|-
| Loss
| align=center| 12–4
| Dae Hwan Kim
| Submission (rear-naked choke)
| ONE FC 14: War of Nations
| 
| align=center| 1
| align=center| 4:39
| Kuala Lumpur, Malaysia
| 
|-
|  Win
| align=center| 12–3
| David Aranda Santacana
| KO (punches)
| ONE FC 13: Moment of Truth
| 
| align=center| 1
| align=center| 2:53
| Pasay, Philippines
| 
|-
| Loss
| align=center| 11–3
| Masakatsu Ueda
| Decision (unanimous)
| ONE FC 9: Rise to Power
| 
| align=center| 3
| align=center| 5:00
| Manila, Philippines
| 
|-
| Win
| align=center| 11–2
| Thanh Vu
| TKO (punches)
| ONE FC 8: Kings and Champions
| 
| align=center| 2
| align=center| 1:00
| Singapore City, Singapore
| 
|-
| Win
| align=center| 10–2
| Yusup Saadulaev
| TKO (punches)
| ONE FC 6: Rise of Kings
| 
| align=center| 1
| align=center| 3:18
| Kallang, Singapore
| 
|-
| Loss
| align=center| 9–2
| Soo Chul Kim
| Decision (unanimous)
| ONE FC 5: Pride of Nation
| 
| align=center| 3
| align=center| 5:00
| Quezon City, Philippines
| 
|-
| Loss
| align=center| 9–1
| Masakazu Imanari
| Submission (reverse heel hook)
| ONE FC 3: War of Lions
| 
| align=center| 1
| align=center| 1:18
| Kallang, Singapore
|  
|-
| Win
| align=center| 9–0
| Isaac Tuling
| TKO (head kick and punches)
| URCC 19 - Collision
| 
| align=center| 1
| align=center| 6:25
| Sentosa, Singapore
| 
|-
| Win
| align=center| 8–0
| Dalai Bayin
| Submission (rear-naked choke)
| Legend FC: Legend Fighting Championship 3
| 
| align=center| 1
| align=center| 4:40
| Hong Kong, Hong Kong
| 
|-
| Win
| align=center| 7–0
| Nam Jin Jo
| Decision (unanimous)
| Legend FC: Legend Fighting Championship 2
| 
| align=center| 3
| align=center| 5:00
| Hong Kong, Hong Kong
| 
|-
| Win
| align=center| 6–0
| Ngoo Ditty
| KO (punch)
| MC: Martial Combat 2
| 
| align=center| 1
| align=center| 0:08
| Singapore, Singapore
| 
|-
| Win
| align=center| 5–0
| Jilmar Tangayan
| Decision (unanimous)
| URCC-Rogue Magazine's Black The Brawl 2009
| 
| align=center| 2
| align=center| 10:00
| Makati, Philippines
| 
|-
| Win
| align=center| 4–0
| Justin Cruz
| TKO (punches)
| URCC 13 - Indestructible
| 
| align=center| 1
| align=center| 0:52
| Makati, Philippines
| 
|-
| Win
| align=center| 3–0
| Magellan Perez
| TKO (punches)
| URCC 12: Indestructible
| 
| align=center| 1
| align=center| 0:15
| Makati, Philippines
| 
|-
| Win
| align=center| 2–0
| Roldan Cartajena
| Submission (armbar)
| URCC 11: Redemption
| 
| align=center| 1
| align=center| 8:42
| Pasay, Philippines
| 
|-
| Win
| align=center| 1–0
| Richard Lasprilla
| Decision (majority)
| URCC 10
| 
| align=center| 1
| align=center| 7:24
| Taguig, Philippines
|

See also
 List of current ONE fighters

References

External links
 Kevin Belingon at ONE
 

1987 births
Living people
Filipino male mixed martial artists
Filipino sanshou practitioners
Flyweight mixed martial artists
Bantamweight mixed martial artists
Mixed martial artists utilizing sanshou
University of the Cordilleras alumni
People from Ifugao
ONE Championship champions